Sean Thomas Casten (born November 23, 1971) is an American businessman and politician serving as the U.S. representative for . The district covers portions of five counties in Chicago's western suburbs, including Wheaton, Palatine, and Barrington. He is a member of the Democratic Party.

Due to redistricting as a result of the 2020 United States census, Casten and fellow Democrat Marie Newman contended to represent the same district in the 2022 Democratic primary election. Casten defeated Newman in the primary election on June 28, 2022.  He won the general election, beating the Republican nominee, Orland Park mayor Keith Pekau, on November 8, 2022.

Early life and education
Born in Dublin, Ireland, to American parents, and raised in Hartsdale, New York, Casten earned a Bachelor of Arts in molecular biology and biochemistry from Middlebury College in 1993. He then worked for two years as a scientist at the Tufts University School of Medicine. In 1998, he earned a Master of Engineering Management and a Master of Science in biochemical engineering from the Thayer School of Engineering at Dartmouth College.

Business career
Casten began his career working at consultancy Arthur D. Little, where he did fuel chain analyses for the company's chemical engineering group. From 2000 to 2007, he served as the president and CEO of Turbosteam Corporation, which converted emissions from power plants into energy.

In 2007, Casten and his father, Tom Casten, founded Recycled Energy Development (RED). RED focused on recycling wasted energy and converting energy facilities to cleaner, more economic uses. RED attempted to make profitable use of waste heat capturing technology, an avenue of electricity generation that attracted interest from a number of startup companies looking to find a "breakthrough" in the technology. In 2015, an investor in RED sued the company, alleging mismanagement by Casten. Casten settled the lawsuit and sold the company in 2016; he said the allegations against him were untrue and were part of a hostile takeover attempt.

Casten was a founding chairman of the Northeast CHP Initiative. He participated in crafting the bill that became the Regional Greenhouse Gas Initiative (RGGI), a program in the northeast United States that attempts to use market forces to reduce greenhouse gas emissions.

U.S. House of Representatives

Elections

2018 

He defeated six other contenders in the 2018 Democratic primary to become the party's nominee against six-term incumbent Republican Peter Roskam.

On November 6, 2018, Casten won the election, defeating Roskam by a margin of seven points.

This race was viewed as one that Democrats needed to win in order to regain control of the U.S. House of Representatives for the first time since the 2010 elections. Illinois's 6th congressional district supported Democratic presidential nominee Hillary Clinton by about 7 percentage points in the 2016 presidential election. This was one of 25 GOP-held seats in the U.S. Representatives that Clinton carried in 2016; Democrats flipped 23 of them in 2018.

2020 

Casten was reelected in 2020, defeating former state legislator and gubernatorial primary candidate Jeanne Ives by seven points.

2022 

The 2022 reapportionment merged a large slice of Newman's district into Casten's district. Although it retained Casten's district number, it was geographically more Newman's district than Casten's. According to calculations by Daily Kos, Newman retained 41% of her constituents and Casten retained 23% of his. Nevertheless, Casten won the nomination.

Tenure
, Casten had voted in line with President Joe Biden's stated position 99% of the time during the 117th Congress.

Climate change and energy
Casten says his number one issue in Congress is energy policy and climate change. He is a member of the House Select Committee on the Climate Crisis. Of working with Congress on clean energy policy, Casten has said, "[T]he folks who really understand the energy system tend to be Republicans, and the folks who really understand environmental science tend to be Democrats. And there's a gap in talking to each other". "We have a PhD-level problem. And Congress is at a 6th-grade reading level", he has said. 

Casten has introduced several bills related to energy policy, among them the Climate Risk Disclosure Act and the End Oil and Gas Subsidies Act. The Clean Industrial Technology Act of 2019 would have established a program to incentivize innovation in greenhouse gas emissions from manufacturing.

Reparations
Casten is a sponsor of the Commission to Study and Develop Reparation Proposals for African-Americans Act. The bill would allow history books to go into more depth on African American struggles and set up a reparations commission for those with enslaved ancestors.

Voting rights
Casten voted for Ayanna Pressley's amendment to H.R. 1, the Voting Rights Act, which would lower the voting age to 16.

Abortion 
Casten is an outspoken supporter of abortion rights. Following the Dobbs v. Jackson Women's Health Organization decision, Casten voted for H.R.8296, the Women's Health Protection Act of 2022, which would protect a person's ability to end a pregnancy and a healthcare provider's ability to provide abortion services.

Syria 
In 2023, Casten voted against H.Con.Res. 21 which directed President Joe Biden to remove U.S. troops from Syria within 180 days.

Structural changes to make Federal government more representative 
In the 118th Congress Casten co-sponsored three bills to restructure Congress and the judicial branches of the U.S. government to make them more representative:
 The Equal Voices Act would periodically adjust the number of Representatives in the House of Representatives so that each Congressional District would be computed by the population of the least populated state. Using the 2020 census, there would have been 138 more Representatives than present, each representing a district roughly the population of Wyoming.
 The Senate Reform constitutional amendment would add 12 new Senators elected at-large by ranked-choice voting from the entire electorate (including non-states such as District of Columbia). It would also add 12 presidential electors who would be pledged to vote according to the national popular vote.
 The Restoring Judicial Separation of Powers Act would restructure the federal courts and appeals process to make it more difficult for one party to game the system by stacking the courts.

Committee assignments

Committee on Financial Services
Subcommittee on Investor Protection, Entrepreneurship and Capital Markets
Subcommittee on Oversight and Investigations
Committee on Science, Space, and Technology
Subcommittee on Energy
Subcommittee on Environment
Select Committee on the Climate Crisis

Caucus memberships 
New Democrat Coalition
 Congressional Freethought Caucus
 House Pro-Choice Caucus

Electoral history

Personal life
Casten and his wife, Kara, live in Downers Grove, Illinois.

On June 13, 2022, Casten's daughter Gwen died at the age of 17 from sudden cardiac arrest. According to Casten, his daughter had been in good health, and was fully vaccinated against COVID-19.

Casten's father is businessman Tom Casten, with whom he has worked.

Casten is among the handful of representatives in congress to not identify with any religion.

References

External links 

 Congressman Sean Casten official U.S. House website
Sean Casten for Congress official campaign site

|-

1971 births
21st-century American politicians
Dartmouth College alumni
Democratic Party members of the United States House of Representatives from Illinois
Living people
Middlebury College alumni
Thayer School of Engineering alumni
People from Downers Grove, Illinois
Politicians from Dublin (city)
Irish emigrants to the United States